City of Los Angeles v. Lyons, 461 U.S. 95 (1983), was a United States Supreme Court decision holding that the plaintiff, Adolph Lyons, lacked standing to challenge the city police department's use of chokeholds.

Background
In 1976, Adolph Lyons was stopped by four white officers of the Los Angeles Police Department (LAPD) for driving with a broken tail light. The unarmed 24-year-old was ordered to leave his vehicle by officers with guns drawn and to spread his legs and put his hands on top of his head. After being frisked, Lyons put his hands down. That prompted one officer to grab his hands and slam them against his head.

When Lyons complained that holding his car keys was causing him pain, a police officer put him in a chokehold until he lost consciousness. He woke up lying face down in the road with soiled underwear and blood and dirt in his mouth. The officers gave him a traffic citation and sent him on his way.

Seven years later, he sought both compensatory damages for the chokehold and declaratory and injunctive relief against the LAPD's chokehold policy (he introduced evidence from 1975 to 1983 that 16 people, including 12 African-Americans, had been killed by the LAPD using chokeholds.)

Decision
In an opinion authored by Justice White, the Court held 5-4 that Lyons had failed to allege a sufficiently-plausible threat of future injury to have standing to seek an injunction. Lyons, however, had standing for his damages action since it was retrospective and the injury, being subjected to the chokehold, was concrete and particular. The decision helped to establish the principle that a plaintiff must meet a standing requirement for each form of relief sought.

Dissenting opinion
Justice Marshall's dissent argued that the majority's test would immunize from review any widespread policy that deprives constitutional rights when individuals cannot show with certainty that they would be subject to a repeat violation. He also argued that the Court's traditional rule did not distinguish different forms of relief for standing purposes.

Commentary
Based on Michelle Alexander's book The New Jim Crow Lyons' case is related to what is believed to be biased action towards certain races, in this case African-Americans. She asserts that it is hard for people of color like Lyons to prevail in the judicial process, like during the Jim Crow era. According to Alexander, one of the causes of such issues is the presence of implicit bias in the criminal justice system, including the courts and police officers. In support of Alexander's argument, Georgetown Law Professor Charles Lawrence noted, "The purposeful intent requirement found in Supreme Court equal protection doctrine, and in the court's interpretation of antidiscrimination laws disserved the value of equal citizenship expressed in those laws because many forms of racial bias are unconscious." As specified above, since Lyons' case involves legal system, unconscious bias may produce negative outcomes for African-Americans.

See also
List of United States Supreme Court cases, volume 461

References

External links

 Ronald T. Gerwatowski, Standing and Injunctions: The Demise of Public Law Litigation and Other Effects of Lyons, Boston College Law Review, vol 25 p 765 (1984), http://lawdigitalcommons.bc.edu/bclr/vol25/iss4/3

United States Constitution Article Three case law
United States Supreme Court cases
United States Supreme Court cases of the Burger Court
United States standing case law
1982 in United States case law
History of Los Angeles
Chokeholds
Los Angeles Police Department